Viimsi staadion was a football and rugby stadium in Haabneeme, Viimsi Parish, Estonia, just outside the capital Tallinn with the capacity of 2,000. The stadium was formerly used by a now-defunct Lantana Tallinn football club. The pitch size was 105 by 70 metres. As of 2007 the stadium was home to the Tallinn Rugby Football Club and the temporary home of the Estonian National Rugby Union team via cooperation between the Estonian Rugby Union and Nord West Kinnisvara OÜ. The team is governed by the Estonian Rugby Union, which oversees all rugby union in Estonia.

The address of the Stadium was Sõpruse 7, 74001 Viimsi Parish.

References

External links
Tallinn Sharks Rugby Club homepage 

Viimsi Parish
Football venues in Estonia
Rugby union stadiums in Estonia
Buildings and structures in Harju County